Carlos María Abascal Carranza (June 14, 1949 – December 2, 2008) was a Mexican lawyer and the Secretary of the Interior in the cabinet of Vicente Fox. He is the son of the writer Salvador Abascal, famous for his synarchist ideas.

Biography
Carlos Abascal studied law at Escuela Libre de Derecho in Mexico City, graduating in 1973 with a thesis entitled "Relations between Spiritual Power and Temporal Power", in which he stated, inter alia, that "democracy is a farce that has been used by Freemasons in Mexico... to make a confused and disoriented majority believe that its will is being done". He later pursued business management studies at the IPADE. For about thirty years he worked for Afianzadora Insurgentes where he began as messenger and trainee in the legal area and ended as Director and CEO. He retired from Afianzadora Insurgentes in August 2000.

Abascal has occupied different positions in private and social organizations. He has been president of the Fundación para el Desarrollo Sostenible en México (FUNDES), president of Vertebra, president of the Movimiento Social y de Administración de Valores (AVAL), vice-president of the Instituto Mexicano de Doctrina Social Cristiana (IMDOSOC), and president of the Confederación Patronal de la República Mexicana (COPARMEX).

Abascal served in the Legislative Assembly of the Federal District from 1994 to 1997. He then became one of President Vicente Fox's key cabinet members. In 2000 Fox appointed Abascal as Secretary of Labor. In 2005, following Santiago Creel's resignation, Abascal was appointed Secretary of the Interior.

He was opposed to some birth control methods such as abortion and the contraceptive pill. He spoke out against "liberal" literature, including the novel Aura by Carlos Fuentes, which Abascal judged as inappropriate for his thirteen-year-old daughter and requested that her private school reconsider including in its curriculum.

Death
Abascal died of esophageal cancer on the morning of December 2, 2008.

Canonization

In 2009, various Catholic organizations asked the Roman Catholic Archdiocese of Mexico to begin the process for the canonization of Abascal given his virtues and his ability to participate in politics without renouncing his Catholic values.

References

External links
Profile at Mexico's Presidency of the Republic site 

|-

Escuela Libre de Derecho alumni
Deaths from cancer in Mexico
Deaths from stomach cancer
Members of the Congress of Mexico City
Mexican Secretaries of Labor
Mexican Secretaries of the Interior
Mexican people of Basque descent
Politicians from Mexico City
Academic staff of the Panamerican University
1949 births
2008 deaths
20th-century Mexican politicians
21st-century Mexican politicians